Oxford is a village in Chenango County, New York, United States. The population was 1,450 at the 2010 census. The village is named after Oxford, Massachusetts, the hometown of the landowner.

The village of Oxford is in the northern part of the town of Oxford, southwest of the city of Norwich.

History
The village was founded by its first settlers in 1791, including the landowner Benjamin Hovey (1758–1811) who was later a business partner of Aaron Burr and his cousin Theodore Burr.

The former Chenango Canal passed through the village, connecting the community to Utica and Binghamton.

In 1985, many of its historic buildings were included in the Oxford Village Historic District on the National Register of Historic Places.

Geography
The village of Oxford is located in the northern part of the town of Oxford at  (42.442354, -75.597822), in south-central Chenango County. The Chenango River, a south-flowing tributary of the Susquehanna River, divides the village.

According to the United States Census Bureau, the village has a total area of  all land.

New York State Route 12 (Canal Street) intersects New York State Route 220 (State Street to the west and Main Street to the east) in the village. NY-12 leads northeast  to Norwich, the county seat, and southwest  to Greene.

Demographics

At the 2000 census there were 1,584 people, 607 households and 423 families residing in the village. The population density was 890.8 per square mile (343.6/km2). There were 684 housing units at an average density of 384.7 per square mile (148.4/km2). The racial makeup of the village was 97.79% White, 1.01% Black or African American, 0.13% Native American, 0.38% Asian, 0.06% from other races, and 0.63% from two or more races. Hispanic or Latino of any race were 1.20% of the population.

There were 607 households, of which 33.3% had children under the age of 18 living with them, 51.1% were married couples living together, 12.4% had a female householder with no husband present, and 30.3% were non-families. 26.2% of all households were made up of individuals, and 13.3% had someone living alone who was 65 years of age or older. The average household size was 2.52 and the average family size was 2.98.

25.6% of the population were under the age of 18, 8.8% from 18 to 24, 24.6% from 25 to 44, 23.7% from 45 to 64, and 17.4% who were 65 years of age or older. The median age was 39 years. For every 100 females, there were 94.8 males. For every 100 females age 18 and over, there were 91.7 males.

The median household income was $37,692 and the median family income was $43,125. Males had a median income of $29,408 and females $22,222. The per capita income for the village was $16,576. About 7.7% of families and 14.3% of the population were below the poverty line, including 20.4% of those under age 18 and 6.3% of those age 65 or over.

References

External links

 Village of Oxford official website
  Oxford Chamber of Commerce

Villages in New York (state)
Populated places established in 1791
Villages in Chenango County, New York
1791 establishments in New York (state)